The Journal of Biomaterials Applications is a peer-reviewed medical journal covering the development and clinical applications of biomaterials. The editor-in-chief is Jonathan Knowles (University College London). The journal was established in 1986 and is published by SAGE Publications.

Abstracting and indexing 
The journal is abstracted and indexed in Academic Search Premier, MEDLINE, the Material Science Citation Index, Current Contents, Scopus, and the Science Citation Index Expanded. According to the Journal Citation Reports, the journal has a 2020 impact factor of 2.646.

References

External links 
 

SAGE Publishing academic journals
English-language journals
Publications established in 1986
Materials science journals